Anning Smith Prall (September 17, 1870 – July 23, 1937) was a 6-term U.S. Representative from New York from 1923 to 1935.

He was born in Port Richmond, Staten Island and the first chief commissioner of the Federal Communications Commission (FCC). Prall served as a member and chairman of the FCC from January 15, 1935, until his death in 1937 at his summer home in Boothbay Harbor, Maine.

Career

In his early years Prall was employed as a clerk in a New York newspaper office. Prall attended New York University, studying business.  From 1908 until 1918 he was in charge of a real estate department of a bank, while serving as the first president of the Staten Island Board of Realtors from 1915 to 1916.

In 1918 Prall began a public service career when he was appointed Clerk of New York City's First District Municipal Court.  He was appointed a member of the New York City Board of Education on January 1, 1918, and served until December 31, 1921, and was elected the board's president.  He was New York City's commissioner of taxes and assessment from 1922 to 1923.

He was a delegate to the 1924 Democratic National Convention and was elected as a Democrat to the Sixty-eighth Congress to fill the vacancy caused by the death of Daniel J. Riordan.  He was reelected to the sixty-ninth and to the four succeeding Congresses and served from November 6, 1923, to January 3, 1935.  He was not a candidate for renomination in 1934.

Death
He died on July 23, 1937 and is interred at Moravian Cemetery in New Dorp, Staten Island.

Legacy
Intermediate school (I.S.) 27 on Staten Island is also known as the Anning S. Prall School. He also served as Chairman of the FCC from March 9, 1935, to June 23, 1937.

References

Specific

External links
Anning Smith Prall entry at The Political Graveyard

 

1870 births
1937 deaths
Chairmen of the Federal Communications Commission
People from Staten Island
Democratic Party members of the United States House of Representatives from New York (state)
New York University Stern School of Business alumni
People from Boothbay Harbor, Maine
Franklin D. Roosevelt administration personnel
Burials at Moravian Cemetery